Secretoglobin family 3A member 1 is a protein that in humans is encoded by the SCGB3A1 gene.

References

Further reading